Atherton High School is a public school in the Highlands district of Louisville, Kentucky, United States, and is part of the Jefferson County Public School district. It opened in 1924 as J.M. Atherton High School for Girls at 1418 Morton Avenue. It is named after John McDougal Atherton, a local businessman and politician who was instrumental in changing Louisville's school system administration from trustees to a board of education. The school became coeducational in 1950.

Atherton moved to its current site in 1962 on the old Ray and Charles Clagett estate and its old premises is now the Jefferson County Traditional Middle School. A new wing was added to the Dundee location in 1992.

Atherton offers an International Studies Program and an International Baccalaureate (IB) Program. The IB Program is the only one in the city at a public school, and also the only one open to boys (the city's other IB program is at the all-girls' Sacred Heart Academy, a Catholic school). Students also have the option of enrolling in Advanced Placement or Honors classes as well as in the Advanced Placement Program, Exceptional Child Education Program, and English as a Second Language Program.

Notable alumni

Bill Bishop, author and journalist
 Michelle Clark-Heard, current University of Cincinnati women's basketball head coach
Jane Eskind, politician
Andrew Farrell, MLS player
Don Francisco, musician, contemporary Christian music

Sue Grafton, mystery writer
 Jack Harlow, rapper
 Oksana Masters, Paralympic rower and cross-country skier; bronze medalist at the 2012 Summer Paralympics and silver medalist at the 2014 Winter Paralympics
Martha Rofheart (née Jones), actress & writer who grew up at 2120 Portland in the 1920s & 30s, graduated in 1932/33.
Hunter S. Thompson, journalist and author (graduated from Louisville Male High School)
Charlie Tyra, first All-American basketball player at the University of Louisville
Jess Weixler, actress
Rick Wilson, basketball player, retired
Jonathan Wolff, music composer
John Yarmuth, U.S. Representative from Kentucky

See also
 Public schools in Louisville, Kentucky

References

External links
J. M. Atherton High School Website

Jefferson County Public Schools (Kentucky)
International Baccalaureate schools in Kentucky
Public high schools in Kentucky
Educational institutions established in 1924
1924 establishments in Kentucky
High schools in Louisville, Kentucky